Anatolian Hieroglyphs is a Unicode block containing Anatolian hieroglyphs, used to write the extinct Luwian language.

History
The following Unicode-related documents record the purpose and process of defining specific characters in the Anatolian Hieroglyphs block:

References 

Unicode blocks